Velosaurus is an outdoor 2015 concrete and painted steel sculpture by Horatio Law, installed beneath the Powell Blvd. Light Rail Overpass between the MAX Orange Line's Clinton St/SE 12th Ave and Clinton St/SE 12th Ave stations in southeast Portland, Oregon, in the United States. The piece is a series of eight bas-relief panels made of recycled bicycle and skateboard parts, arranged to appear like dinosaur skeletal remains.

See also 
 2015 in art

References

External links 
 First Look: Trimet's 'Velosaurus' sculpture will adorn new path across SE Powell by Jonathan Maus (October 16, 2012), Bike Portland
 Clinton/SE 12th Ave Station (October 2014), TriMet
 "Velosaurus" lurks beneath Powell railroad overpass at 17th by Rita A. Leonard (October 2, 2015), The Bee

2015 establishments in Oregon
2015 sculptures
Concrete sculptures in Oregon
Dinosaur sculptures
Sculptures on the MAX Orange Line
Outdoor sculptures in Portland, Oregon
Southeast Portland, Oregon
Steel sculptures in Oregon